Suhtal (also Romanized as Sūhtāl; also known as Sūtāl) is a village in Golashkerd Rural District, in the Central District of Faryab County, Kerman Province, Iran. At the 2006 census, its population was 78, in 21 families.

References 

Populated places in Faryab County